Petre Havaleț (27 June 1909 - 1956) was a Romanian athlete. He competed in the men's discus throw at the 1936 Summer Olympics.

References

1909 births
1956 deaths
Athletes (track and field) at the 1936 Summer Olympics
Romanian male discus throwers
Olympic athletes of Romania
Place of birth missing